Portrait of a Man in a Red Cap, also known as Man with a Red Cap, is an oil painting by the Venetian painter Titian, made in about 1516. It is part of the Frick Collection in New York City.

Date 
Two portraits of young men have been ascribed to the years immediately following Titian's stay at Padua: namely the Man with a Red Cap and the Man with a Glove. The Frick Collection dates the former picture slightly later.

Provenance 

Although the sitter has not been identified, this portrait was apparently well known, at least in the seventeenth century, and Carlo Dolci painted a copy of the figure into the background of his Martyrdom of Saint Andrew (Palazzo Pitti, Florence).

The painting passed through several private hands before being auctioned by Christie's in 1906 and purchased by Sir Hugh Lane, from whom it was eventually acquired by Henry Clay Frick in 1915. The art critic Charles Ricketts, writing in 1910, recalled the 1906 rediscovery of a portrait by Titian:

References

Sources 
 Ryskamp, Charles; Davidson, Bernice; Galassi, Susan; Munhall, Edgar; Tscherny, Nadia (1996). Art in the Frick Collection: Paintings, Sculpture, Decorative Arts. New York: Harry N. Abrams, Inc. pp. 26, 50.
 "Portrait of a Man in a Red Hat - Collections". The Frick Collection. Retrieved 21 August 2022.
 "Portrait of a Man in a Red Cap - Exhibitions". The Frick Collection. Retrieved 21 August 2022.

Attribution:

Man in a Red Cap
1510s paintings
Portrait paintings in the Frick Collection